The Granat zaczepny wz.24 (Polish for Offensive grenade, Mark 1924) was a concussion grenade used by the Polish Army before and during World War II. The oval egg-shaped shell casing was made of thin sheet metal filled with picric acid or TNT. Initially used with a variety of fuses, since early 1930s the grenade was used with the standard Zapalnik wz. Gr. 31 time fuse designed for the Defensive grenade wz.33. The grenade armed with the wz. Gr. 31 fuse is sometimes referred to as wz. 24/31 to distinguish it from the original wz.24 grenade armed with different fuses.

Hand grenades of Poland
World War II infantry weapons of Poland
Concussion grenades